Ruthie Davis is the founder, designer, and president of luxury shoe brand Ruthie Davis. Her shoes are worn by celebrities, including Beyoncé and Lady Gaga. She was named American Apparel and Footwear Association's 2014 Footwear Designer of the Year.

Early life and education 
At the age of three, Davis insisted on wearing a pair of red patent leather Mary Janes to bed. The youngest of six kids, Ruthie was no stranger to hand-me-downs. Davis excelled in sports, and grew up skiing and playing tennis, which gave her equipment and apparel that was all her own. The novelty, sleek lines and dynamism of the items raised Davis’ interest in apparel and fashion. Davis graduated in 1980 with honors from Loomis Chaffee, where she became the first girl to make the boys’ ski team. Davis went on to study at Bowdoin College, where she studied English Literature and Visual Arts, and participated in a variety of extracurricular activities, from writing for The Bowdoin Orient to captaining the tennis team. Davis went on to receive an MBA in marketing and entrepreneurship at Babson’s Olin Business School.

Career

Early work 
Davis' first job after college was as a sportswriter for the Courant. Davis’ first shoe job was at Reebok, where she became the director of the Reebok Classic division. Davis then served at UGG, where she worked as Vice President of Marketing and Design and transformed the label into a fashion brand. Davis then accepted the position of Vice President of Marketing and Design for Women's Footwear at Tommy Hilfiger, a job which moved her from California to New York. She launched Ruthie Davis in 2006.

The brand today 
Davis is involved with a number of brand collaborations including Disney X Ruthie Davis where she won the American Image Award AAFA for Collaboration of the Year, Ruthie Davis X Minions with Universal Illumination, Ruthie Davis X Designow (her first apparel collection), and Ruthie Davis for Beauty & The Beast for HSN/Disney. She launched a vegan shoe collaboration with menswear designer and animal activist John Bartlett. Davis also designs custom shoes for Lady Gaga, Beyonce, Zendaya and Billy Porter.

Outside the brand
In addition to overseeing the operation of her company, Ruthie serves as a television fashion commentator.

References 

Shoe designers
Living people
Year of birth missing (living people)
Olin Business School (Washington University) alumni
Bowdoin College alumni